The Madagascar jacana (Actophilornis albinucha) is a species of bird in the family Jacanidae.
It is endemic to Madagascar.

References

Actophilornis
Endemic birds of Madagascar
Birds described in 1832
Taxonomy articles created by Polbot
Taxa named by Isidore Geoffroy Saint-Hilaire